Mariana Valente (born September 25, 1985) is a Brazilian-Canadian actress and model who won the Miss Universe Canada 2009 beauty pageant and represented Canada in Miss Universe 2009.

Miss Universe Canada
She won the title of Miss Universe Canada 2009.

References

Miss Universe Canada winners
Canadian beauty pageant winners
Female models from Ontario
Canadian people of Brazilian descent
Living people
Miss Universe 2009 contestants
1985 births
Brazilian emigrants to Canada
People from Richmond Hill, Ontario